Ravi Vallathol (25 November 1952  25 April 2020) was an Indian actor, mainly noted for his acting in many famous serials, including the first serial in Malayalam.

Biography

He was born as the son of famous Drama legend T. N. Gopinathan Nair and Soudamini. He was the grandnephew of the famous Malayalam poet Vallathol Narayana Menon.

He acted in more than 100 TV series and more than 50 Movies. He wrote 25 short stories and a few plays. Some of his short stories were made into TV serials and his play Revathikkoru Pavakkutty was remade into a movie in the same name. He played some noted roles in famous Malayalam movies like Nee Varuvolam and Godfather.

He was awarded best actor in the Kerala State Television Awards for his performance in the TV series ‘American Dreams'. He was also awarded best actor in the Asianet Television Awards for his performance in the soap opera series Parijatham.

Early life 

He was born as eldest among three children to T. N. Gopinathan Nair, a writer and drama artiste of All India Radio and Soudamini in Vallathol family of Tirur. He was nephew of Mahakavi Vallathol Narayana Menon and grandson of Justice P. K. Narayana Pillai and Kuttipurahu Kesavan Nair. He was also the cousin of popular film actor T. P. Madhavan. He had a younger brother, V. Nandakumar and a younger sister, Meenakshy. He did his schooling at Sisuvihar, Model H.S. and was graduated from Mar Ivanios College, Trivandrum and did his Post Graduation at Kerala University, Karyavattom.

Ravi Vallathol made his debut as an actor on the small screen in 1986 with the serial 'Vaitharani' in Doordarshan, scripted by his father, the late T.N. Gopinathan Nair and directed by noted Malayalam poet, song writer and director P. Bhaskaran He also acted in more than 100 television serials including American Dreams in Asianet. He entered Malayalam film industry by writing the song “Thazhvarayil manju poothu" in the 1976 movie Madhuram Thirumadhuram. The movie he first acted in was Swathi Tirunal directed by Lenin Rajendran. He acted in 46 movies in his career including movies like Godfather, Vishnulokam, Nee Varuvolam and Mathilukal. He acted in seven movies directed by the internationally known Malayalam director Adoor Gopalakrishnan. The Dolphins was his last movie.

He completed 26 years in Malayalam television industry in 2012. He published more than 25 short stories. His stories Devaranjini and Nimanjanam were made into serials. Ravi acted and scripted many dramas such as Mazha, Ayaal.

His stage play Revathikkoru Pavakkutty was made into a film.

Personal life

He was married to Geethalakshmi on 1 January 1980. The couple had no children. They were running an organisation for mentally challenged people named "Thanal". He died in his own residence in Thiruvananthapuram on 25 April 2020, due to acute diabetes which led to a heart attack .

Awards
Kerala State Television Award for Best Actor 2003: American Dreams
Kerala Sangeetha Nataka Akademi Award 2012
Asianet Television Awards 2011 - Best Character Actor: Paarijatham

Filmography
 2016 - Autobiography of a Stray Dog- as Voice Artiste'
2014 - Polytechnique
 2014 - The Dolphins 2013 - Weeping Boy
 2013 - Silence
 2013 - Idukki Gold ..... Sadanandan
 2011 - Uppukandam Brothers Back in Action ..... Kuttan Maraar 
 2010 - Kaaryasthan ..... Himself
 2008 - Oru Pennum Randanum 2007 - Naalu Pennungal 2006 - Ravanan....... Justice Raghava Menon
 2006 - The Don...Dileep's father
 2004 - Nizhalkuthu 2004 - Kusruthi..... Sree Vallabhan
 2002 - Pranayamanithooval ..... Vishwanath 
 2002 - Chathurangam .....  Ramachandran 
 2001 - Dhosth
 2001 - Pranaya Manthram 2000 - Indriyam 2000 - Dada Sahib.... Magistrate
 1999 - Stalin Sivadas .... Manoj
 1999 - Kannezhuthi Pottum Thottu ..... Chackochi 
 1998 - Samaantharangal ..... Murali 
 1997 - Kalyana Unnikal 1997 - Kalyaanakkacheri 1997 - Nee Varuvolam 1997 - Hitler Brothers ..... Kuttan Pillai 
 1996 - Kazhakam 1996 - Kadhaapurushan ..... Kunjunni's Half Brother
 1995 - Sadaram...... Madhavan 
 1994 - Sagaram Sakshi ..... Adv. Radhakrishnan Nair 
 1994 - Vidheyan..... Patelar's nephew 
 1994 - Commissioner ..... K. M. Varghese 
 1994 - Puthran .... Alexander
 1993 - Bhoomi Geetham ...Devan
 1993 - Dhruvam... Police Constable
 1992 - Sargam 1992 - Utsavamelam 1991 - Aanaval Mothiram 1991 - Vishnulokam 1991 - Ottayal Pattalam 1991 - Godfather ..... Balakrishnan 
 1990 - Ee Thanutha Veluppan Kalathu .... Doctor 
 1990 - Kottayam Kunjachan .... Joy
 1990 - Mathilukal ... Razzaq 
 1989 - Oru Sayahnathinte Swapnam 1989 - Season ...News Reporter
 1989 - Nayanangal 1987 - Swathi Thirunal'' .... Singer

Television career
Eran Nilavu (flowers)
Sparsham (Media one)
Eran Nilavu (DD)
Chandralekha (Asianet)
 Badra (Surya TV)
Nandanam (Surya TV)
Vrindravanam (Asianet)
Alvudinte Albudhavilakku (Asianet)
Devimahatmyam (Asianet)
Paarijatham (Asianet)
Sreeguruvayoorappan (Surya TV)
Ammakkayi (Surya TV)
 Kanakinavu (Surya TV)
Sundarippovu (Amrita TV)
 American Dreams (Asianet)
Summer in America (Kairali TV)
Swarnamayooram (Asianet)
 Nizhalukal (asianet)
Vasundhara Medicals (Asianet)
 Aruna
Vaitharani (1996- Doordarshan Malayalam)
 Manalnagaram
 May flower
 Pravasam

References

External links
 
 Ravi Vallathol at MSI

Indian male film actors
Male actors from Kerala
People from Malappuram
Male actors in Malayalam cinema
1952 births
2020 deaths
Indian male television actors
Male actors in Malayalam television
20th-century Indian male actors
21st-century Indian male actors
Recipients of the Kerala Sangeetha Nataka Akademi Award